The 16th Canadian Film Awards were held on May 8, 1964 to honour achievements in Canadian film. The ceremony was hosted by Johnny Wayne and Frank Shuster.

Winners

Films
Film of the Year: Pour la suite du monde — National Film Board of Canada, Fernand Dansereau producer, Pierre Perrault and Michel Brault directors
Feature Film: À tout prendre (aka All Things Considered aka Take it All) — Les Films Cassiopée, Orion Films, Claude Jutra and Robert Hershorn producers, Claude Jutra director
Theatrical Short: Anniversary — National Film Board of Canada, William Weintraub producer
Arts and Experimental: Not awarded
TV Information: Cardiac Team — Canadian Broadcasting Corporation, Doug Gillingham producer
TV Entertainment: The Education of Phyllistine — Canadian Broadcasting Corporation, Philip Keatley producer and director
Films for Children: The Origins of Weather — National Film Board of Canada, Joe Koenig director
Travel and Recreation: Rogers Pass — Peter J. Elkington director
Stanley Cup Finals 1963 — Chetwynd Films, Arthur Chetwynd producer
General Information: Fields of Sacrifice — National Film Board of Canada, Donald Brittain producer and director
Public Relations: Brampton Builds a Car — Crawley Films, James Turpie producer and director
Sales Promotion: Land on the Move — Westminster Films, Don Haldane producer and director
Training and Instruction: Mrs. Reynolds Needs a Nurse — Robert Anderson Associates, Robert Anderson producer and director
Filmed Commercial, Company or Product: Kiln — Williams Drege & Hill, Colin Y. Smith director
Molson Export, Wheels — Film Assistance Productions, A. J. Chesterman producer
Filmed Commercial, Public Service: What Shall I Be? — Canadian Broadcasting Corporation, Warren Collins producer
Amateur: House of Toys — London Film Society, Donald Carter director
Certificate of Merit: The Day of the Beginning — John P. FitzGerald director
Certificate of Merit: Fête de nuit — Claude Savard director
Certificate of Merit: Perspective — Derek A. Davy director
Certificate of Merit: Summer's Come to the City — Howard F. Pole director

Non-Feature Craft Awards
Black and White Cinematography: John Spotton, The Hutterites (NFB)
Colour Cinematography: Stanley Brede, Brampton Builds a Car (Crawley Films)

Special Award
Pour la suite du monde, National Film Board of Canada, Pierre Perrault and Michel Brault — "in recognition of its visual qualities, perceptions and artistry, which involve the audience in a revival of earlier traditions at Île-aux-Coudres".

References

Canadian
Canadian Film Awards (1949–1978)
1964 in Canada